James Alexander Greig was an Australian politician. He was a member of the Western Australian Legislative Council representing the South-East Province from his election on 20 April 1916 until the end of his term in 1925. Greig was a member of the Country Party.

References 

Members of the Western Australian Legislative Council
20th-century Australian politicians